Events from the year 1860 in Scotland.

Incumbents

Law officers 
 Lord Advocate – James Moncreiff
 Solicitor General for Scotland – Edward Maitland

Judiciary 
 Lord President of the Court of Session and Lord Justice General – Lord Colonsay
 Lord Justice Clerk – Lord Glenalmond

Events 
 15 September – King's and Marischal Colleges in Aberdeen merge as the University of Aberdeen.
 October – the Royal National Lifeboat Institution stations the first Thurso life-boat at Scrabster.
 17 October – the first professional golf tournament is held at Prestwick, regarded as the first Open (although it is not truly open until the following year when amateurs can participate).
 21 December – St Mary's Cathedral, Aberdeen (Roman Catholic) is dedicated.
 Royal Hospital for Sick Children, Edinburgh, opens.
 Andrew Stewart sets up the Clyde Tube Works in Glasgow, a predecessor of Stewarts & Lloyds.
 Folklorist John Francis Campbell begins publication of Popular Tales of the West Highlands in Edinburgh.

Births 
 6 March – Ronald Munro Ferguson, 1st Viscount Novar, politician, 6th Governor-General of Australia (died 1934)
 7 March – John Duncan Watson, civil engineer (died 1946 in Birmingham)
 22 March – John George Bartholomew, cartographer (died 1920)
 15 April – Edward Arthur Walton, painter (died 1922)
 2 May
 John Scott Haldane, physiologist (died 1936)
 D'Arcy Wentworth Thompson, biologist (died 1948)
 9 May – J. M. Barrie, author (died 1937 in London)
 30 May – Archibald Thorburn, wildlife painter (died 1935 in Surrey, England)
 3 July – William Wallace, composer (died 1940)
 31 July – George Warrender, admiral (died 1917 in London)
 3 August – William Kennedy Dickson, inventor, pioneer of cinematography, born in France (died 1935 in Twickenham, England)
 19 August – John Kane, naïve painter (died 1934 in the United States)
 25 September – John Hope, 7th Earl of Hopetoun, 1st Governor-General of Australia (died 1908 in France)
 21 November – James Leith Macbeth Bain, religious minister, hymn writer and walker (died 1925)
 26 November – James Whitelaw Hamilton, landscape painter (died 1932)
 James Colton, anarchist (died 1936)
 James Miller, architect (died 1947)

Deaths 
 27 January – Major-General Sir Thomas Brisbane, former Governor of New South Wales and astronomer (born 1773)
 25 March – James Braid, surgeon and scientist, often regarded as the first genuine hypnotherapist (born 1795)
 1 April – William Mure, scholar and politician (born 1799)
 25 August – William Wilson, poet and publisher (born 1801)
 James Barr, composer (born 1779)

See also 
 Timeline of Scottish history
 1860 in the United Kingdom

References 

 
Years of the 19th century in Scotland
Scotland
1860s in Scotland